The 2004 Nokia Brier was held from March 6 to 14, 2004 at Saskatchewan Place in Saskatoon, Saskatchewan. The Nova Scotia team skipped by Mark Dacey defeated the Alberta team of Randy Ferbey in dramatic fashion in the final game played on March 14, 2004. Ferbey's team was attempting to become Canadian champion for the fourth consecutive year.

Teams

Round-robin standings
Nova Scotia finished first as they defeated Alberta 8–7 in draw 13. Most of the draws were televised live on TSN.

Round-robin results
All draw times are listed in Central Standard Time (UTC−6).

Draw 1
Saturday, March 6, 1:00 pm

Draw 2
Saturday, March 6, 6:00 pm

Draw 3
Sunday, March 7, 9:00 am

Draw 4
Sunday, March 7, 1:30 pm

Draw 5
Sunday, March 7, 6:30 pm

Draw 6
Monday, March 8, 9:00 am

Draw 7
Monday, March 8, 1:30 pm

Draw 8
Monday, March 8, 6:30 pm

Draw 9
Tuesday, March 9, 9:00 am

Draw 10
Tuesday, March 9, 1:30 pm

Draw 11
Tuesday, March 9, 6:30 pm

Draw 12
Wednesday, March 10, 9:00 am

Draw 13
Wednesday, March 10, 1:30 pm

Draw 14
Wednesday, March 10, 6:30 pm

Draw 15
Thursday, March 11, 9:00 am

Draw 16
Thursday, March 11, 1:30 pm

Draw 17
Thursday, March 11, 6:30 pm

Tiebreaker
Friday, March 12, 9:00 am

Playoffs
The Brier uses the page playoff system, where the top four teams with the best records at the end of round-robin play meet in the playoff rounds. The first and second place teams play each other, with the winner advancing directly to the final. The winner of the other page playoff game between the third and fourth place teams plays the loser of the first/second playoff game in the semi-final. The winner of the semi-final moves on to the final.

Normally the 3 versus 4 page playoff game is played before the 1 versus 2 playoff game on Friday. However, since a tiebreaker was played this year on the same day to decide fourth place, the 1 versus 2 game was played first.

Page playoffs
Game one of the page playoffs was between Mark Dacey's team from Nova Scotia (first overall) versus Randy Ferbey's team from Alberta (second overall).

Friday, March 12, 1:30 pm

Game two of the page playoffs was between Brad Gushue's team from Newfoundland and Labrador (third overall) versus Jay Peachey's team from British Columbia (fourth overall).

Friday, March 12, 6:30 pm

Semifinal
The semifinal was played between Mark Dacey's team from Nova Scotia and Jay Peachey's team from British Columbia.

Saturday, March 13, 1:00 pm

Final
The final was played and televised on the CBC across Canada. Ferbey led 8–4 after the 7th end but Dacey's team put themselves back into the game with a big 3 point 8th end. Forcing Alberta to take a single in the 9th, Dacey was 2 down coming home but had last rock advantage. A couple of errors by Ferbey's team and some good shot making, gave Nova Scotia 3 points in the 10th end and the championship.

Sunday, March 14, 6:00 pm

Statistics

Top 5 player percentages
Round Robin only

Team percentages
Round Robin only

Qualifying

Alberta
@ Hinton
 Randy Ferbey
 Kurt Balderston
 Kevin Martin
 John Morris
 Rob Armitage

British Columbia
@ Nanaimo
 Jay Peachey
 Scott Decap
 Brian Miki
 Wes Craig

Manitoba
@ Brandon
 Brent Scales
 Jeff Stoughton
 Murray Woodward
 Dave Boehmer

New Brunswick
@ Fredericton
 Russ Howard
 Terry Odishaw
 Mike Flannery
 Mike Kennedy

Northern Ontario
@ Sault Ste. Marie
 Rob Gordon
 Jeff Currie
 Denis Malette
 Al Harnden

Ontario
@ Owen Sound
 Mike Harris
 Glenn Howard
 Phil Daniel
 Peter Corner

Nova Scotia
@ Kentville
 Mark Dacey

Newfoundland and Labrador
@ Goose Bay
 Brad Gushue
 Mark Noseworthy
 Keith Ryan
 John Boland

Prince Edward Island
@ Summerside
 Mike Gaudet
 John Likely
 Peter MacDonald
 Andrew Robinson

Saskatchewan
@ Moose Jaw
 Bruce Korte
 Brad Heidt
 Doug Harcourt
 Joel Jordison

Yukon/Northwest Territories
@ Whitehorse
 Brian Wasnea
 Peter O'Driscoll
 Chad Cowan
 Paul Delorey

References

2004
Nokia Brier
Curling in Saskatoon
2004 in Saskatchewan
March 2004 sports events in Canada